Zurita is an Aragonese surname. Notable people with the surname include:

Carlos Zurita, Duke of Soria (born 1943), Spanish academic
Christian Rodrigo Zurita (born 1979), Argentine footballer
Elias Zurita (born 1964), American soccer player
Humberto Zurita (born 1954), Mexican actor, film director and producer
Irving Zurita (born 1991), Mexican footballer
Jerónimo Zurita y Castro (1512–1580), Spanish historian
Juan Zurita (1917–2000), Mexican boxer
Manuel Fernando Zurita, Nicaraguan politician and President of Nicaragua
Maribel Zurita (born 1979), American boxer
Raúl Zurita (born 1950), Chilean poet
Ricardo Zurita (born 1959), American architect
Sebastián Zurita (born 1986), Mexican actor
Dmitri Zurita (born 1987), Mexican-American Visual Artist
Ruben Zurita Delgadillo(born 1990), Mexican Academic

See also
Leonardo Valdés Zurita, Mexican scholar

Surnames of Spanish origin